Adirondack Architectural Heritage (AARCH) is a private nonprofit, membership organization dedicated to the preservation of the historic architecture of New York State’s Adirondack Park.  Their offices are located in the historic Ausable Horse Nail Company office building in Keeseville, New York.

History
AARCH was formed in May, 1990, to promote public understanding, appreciation and stewardship of the Adirondacks' architectural heritage.  The group was initially headed by Dr. Howard Kirschenbaum, who formed it in an effort to save historic Camp Santanoni, an Adirondack Great Camp, from being destroyed by the state when the land it was on was added to the New York Forest Preserve.  The effort was successful, and Santanoni draws more than fifteen thousand visitors a year.

References

New York
1990 establishments in New York (state)
Organizations established in 1990